Christoph Bernhard Cornelius Harms (30 March 1876 – 21 September 1939) was a German economist and one of the first professors to undertake research in the field of international economics. He founded the Kiel Institute for the World Economy, Germany's leading economic research institute, in 1914. Harms was Chair of Economics at the University of Kiel and head of the Institute until he was dismissed from office in 1933 by Nazi Party officials.

Education
Christoph Bernhard Cornelius Harms was born in Detern, Ostfriesland, on June 30, 1876 to Menno F. Harms (1845–?) and Anna M. Ries (1844–1921). In 1887, he attended the Städtische Volksschule in Aurich, and later Gymnasium in Norden. From 1890 to 1893 he completed an apprenticeship (Ausbildung) as a bookbinder in Celle. Harms began a degree in political science at the University of Leipzig (1897), then began a PhD in Economics at University of Tübingen (1900). He completed his doctoral dissertation under Gustav von Schönberg, a founder of the theory of world economy. Two years later, he completed his habilitation.

Harms married in 1902 and had three children.

Harms began teaching as a professor at the University of Jena in 1906, then transferred to the University of Kiel in 1908 where he was Chair of Economics. There, he founded the Kiel Institute for the World Economy.

Kiel Institute for the World Economy

Founded on February 18, 1914, the Kiel Institute for the World Economy has been one of the leading economic research institutes in Germany. It began as the Königliches Institut für Seeverkehr and Weltwirtschaft an der Christian-Albrechts-Universität zu Kiel (Royal Institute for Maritime Transport and World Economics at the University of Kiel). Over the years, Harms worked to build the university's name, attracting well established economists such as Jacob Marschak, Wassily Leontief, Adolph Löwe, Gerhard Colm, and Hans Philipp Neisser. The original mission of the Institute was to challenge the traditional scholar of nationally oriented political economy, and instead opting for a more international view on economic and political affairs.

Expulsion and death
After the electoral victory of the Nazi Party in the March 1933 elections, Harms attempted to protect his Jewish colleagues from persecution. But on April 25, 1933, the Ministry of Culture enacted a new law, the Restoration of the Professional Civil Service. Harms was subsequently removed from the university and later from the Institute. In 1933, Harms worked as an honorary professor in Berlin, then moved to the University of Marburg in 1934. He died in Berlin in 1939. His grave was placed in front of the original building of the Instituteon Düsternbrooker Weg in Kiel.

Legacy

Bernhard Harms Prize

Every two years since 1964, the Kiel Institute for the World Economy has awarded the Bernhard Harms Prize of €25,000 to individuals "with a distinguished record in the field of international economics." Award winners give presentations on their research at the Bernhard Harms Lectures at the Institute, which are then published in the Institute's journal, Review of World Economics / Weltwirtschaftliches Archiv.

Bernhard Harms Medal
Since 1980, the Bernhard Harms Medal is awarded to individuals "who have contributed to the Kiel Institute's research on the world economy in the tradition of Bernhard Harms."

Selected publications
 Zur Entwicklungsgeschichte der Deutschen Buchbinderei in der zweiten Hälfte des 19. Jahrhunderts, Tübingen und Leipzig 1902
 Die Münz- und Geldpolitik der Stadt Basel im Mittelalter. Tübingen 1907 (= Zeitschrift für die gesamte Staatswissenschaft, Ergänzungsheft 23)
 Der Stadthaushalt Basels im ausgehenden Mittelalter: Quellen und Studien zur Basler Finanzgeschichte. Tübingen 1909–1913
  Volkswirtschaft und Weltwirtschaft, Versuch der Begründung einer Weltwirtschaftslehre, Jena 1912
 Der auswärtige Handel in: Philipp Zorn, Herbert von Berger (Schriftleitung): Deutschland unter Kaiser Wilhelm II. Hrsg. von Siegfried Körte, Friedrich Wilhelm von Loebell u. a. 3 Bände. R. Hobbing, Berlin 1914.
 Ferdinand Lassalle und seine Bedeutung für die deutsche Sozialdemokratie [Kopie von 1919], Jena 1919
 Vom Wirtschaftskrieg zur Weltwirtschaftskonferenz, Jena 1927 
 Strukturwandlungen der Deutschen Volkswirtschaft, Vorlesungen gehalten in der Deutschen Vereinigung für Staatswissenschaftliche Fortbildung. Berlin 1928

References

External links
 

1876 births
German economists
International economists
Academic staff of the University of Kiel
People from Leer (district)
1939 deaths